Who Sleeps My Bro is a 2016 Chinese web-series coming-of-age comedy drama series based on the song with the same title sung by Gao Xiaosong. Directed by Zhang Qi, starring Chen Xiao, Du Tianhao, Liu Ruilin, and Li Xian. The series premiered on Jiangsu TV and Zhejiang TV on March 25, 2018. Set in a university, the series tells of the struggles, romances, joys and sorrows of four friends.

Plot
Four boys with different personalities from all directions gather in university, including the cheeky Xi’an boy Lin Xiangyu (Chen Xiao), the small boy who grew up in Shanghai (Liu Ruilin), The rich second-generation Li Dapeng (Du Tianhao) and Xing Xun (Li Xian), a boy from Chongqing who has mixed with society. They try to adjust their life as sophomores by playing together, teasing each other,  even chasing after beautiful students. But this is a short-lived time after all. After entering the society, they ran for their careers and love, and suffered successive setbacks.

Cast
 Chen Xiao as Lin Xiangyu
 Du Tianhao as Li Dapeng
 Liu Ruilin as Guan Chao
 Li Xian as Xie Xun
 Wu You as Xia Xingchen

Production
To meet the image of the rough man required in the play, Li barely went to the playground to play football in the sunshine at 30 ℃. Going to move with the people of the moving company, and finally became a dark, strong, bearded guy-Xie Xun. In 2016 the series adapted into a film starring the original cast.

References

External links

2016 Chinese television series debuts
2016 Chinese television series endings